Arecleoch Wind Farm is a 60 turbine wind farm in South Ayrshire, Scotland with a total capacity of 120 megawatts (MW), enough to power over 67,000 homes. Construction started in 2009 and it was commissioned in June 2011.

Incidents 
In January and February 2016 there were two separate incidents of a turbine catching fire overnight while the site was unmanned due to faults in the HV transformer, there was two further turbine fires over the next 12months. On one occasion there was two technicians climbing the tower as the fire took hold, they escaped without injury. The turbines were destroyed and were disassembled and removed from site. Scottish Power reported to the Sunday Mail on 10 April 2016 they were investigating these incidents along with the manufacturer Gamesa.

See also

Wind power in Scotland
List of onshore wind farms

References

Wind farms in Scotland